ELX may stand for:
 Electronic labor exchange
 English League XI
 Elx, a gender-neutral pronoun in Portuguese
 Elche, a municipality of Spain, also known as Elx in Valencian.